It is the railway station located near to Rockfort and serve the areas near by the station, Gandhi Market and Chatram bus stand. The station code is TPTN, used for official purposes.

References

External links 

Railway stations in Tiruchirappalli